The Vatican Croatian Prayer Book is the oldest Croatian vernacular prayer book and the finest example of early Shtokavian vernacular literary idiom.

Written between 1380 and 1400 in Dubrovnik as a transcript and transliteration from older texts composed in a mixture of Church Slavonic and Chakavian dialect idioms and written down in Glagolitic with some Bosnian Cyrillic script, it retained a few phonological and morphological features found in the original manuscripts. The book contains the following parts: Offices of the Virgin Mary according to the rites of the Roman Church; seven penitentiary psalms; Offices of the Holy Cross; Offices for the dead; Offices of the Holy Spirit as well as numerous prayers. The script is the Roman Gothic, embroidered with luxuriantly outlined initials and miniatures. The name of the prayer book reflects the fact that it is held in the Vatican library. The text has become widely known from 1859, when influential Croatian historian Franjo Rački drew attention to it, but the first critical edition did not appear until 1934, published by Croatian literary historian and philologist . 
 
The book's central importance lies in the fact that it is the first major Shtokavian dialect vernacular text. Although Proto-Shtokavian and mixed Church Slavonic-Shtokavian manuscripts are known to have appeared a century or two before, it is the first text in what can be termed a vernacular dialect. Analyses of the manuscript have shown that recorded morphological and phonological features are transient forms in the development of the dialect, but its syntax is quite archaic, especially compared to the idiom of later prayer books (the Croatian Prayer Book from 1450s, also from Dubrovnik and held in the library of Croatian Academy of Sciences and Arts, Zagreb) or the syntax of Marin Držić's dramas (early 16th century).

Sources
 

14th-century Christian texts
14th-century illuminated manuscripts
Christian prayer books
Christian illuminated manuscripts
Catholic Church in Croatia
Croatian literature
Manuscripts of the Vatican Library
History of the Serbo-Croatian language